HVAC turning vanes are sheet metal devices inside of mechanical ductwork used to smoothly direct air inside a duct where there is a change in direction, by reducing resistance and turbulence.

See also
Duct (HVAC)
Pressurisation ductwork

External links

Building Engineer Word Press Treatise
Turning Vane and Rail Construction Patent #US 3381713 A

Heating, ventilation, and air conditioning